Schochoh is an unincorporated community in Logan County, Kentucky, United States.

History
The community, which is named for a location in Judea, was used as a camp meeting site during the Second Great Awakening before its first permanent buildings were built in the 1850s. It grew from its religious origins into a small farming community noted for its corn. The community holds an annual Christmas parade, which began in 1990 as one resident's joke but soon turned into a serious event.

References

Unincorporated communities in Logan County, Kentucky
Unincorporated communities in Kentucky